Jan Wandelaar (14 April 1690, Amsterdam – 26 March 1759, Leiden), was an 18th-century painter, illustrator and engraver from the Northern Netherlands.

Biography
Wandelaar trained under Jacob Folkema, Gillem van der Gouwen, and Gérard de Lairesse, and made a name in anatomical art after drawing for Fredrik Ruysch. He was due to work for Arend Cant who died before work could begin. According to Johan van Gool he engraved paintings by Huchtenburg.

According to the RKD he was a pupil of Johannes Jacobsz Folkema, Gilliam van der Gouwen, and Gerard de Lairesse. He became the teacher of Pieter Lyonet and Abraham Delfos.

Furthermore, he illustrated and engraved the images for Bernhard Siegfried Albinus's Tabulae sceleti et musculorum corporis humani which included illustrations of the rhinoceros Clara on the background.

References

1690 births
1759 deaths
Botanical illustrators
18th-century Dutch painters
18th-century Dutch male artists
Dutch male painters
Engravers from Amsterdam